Sony Ericsson Aino is a touch screen based slider mobile phone. It has a multimedia PlayStation 3-inspired touch menu (like XrossMediaBar), a large  touchscreen, VGA@30 FPS video recording. The  screen is touch-enabled but only in the multimedia part of the menu and the camera interface. Some third party applications like Opera-Mini also support the touch screen interface. It also has an 8.1-megapixel camera. The Aino uses NetFront 3.5 web browser for internet connectivity.

Technical specifications 

 Model: U10i
 General: GSM 850/900/1800/1900 MHz, UMTS 850/900/2100, GPRS/EDGE class 10, HSDPA 7.2 Mbit/s, No HSUPA
 Form factor: Touchscreen* slider
 Dimensions: 104 × 50 × 15.5 mm, 134 g
 Display: 3-inch 16M color LED display, 240 × 432 pixel resolution
 Memory: 55 MB integrated memory, hot-swappable microSD card slot (up to 32 GB)
 Operating system: Java Platform 8 (also known as A200 platform), running at 200 MHz
 UI: Proprietary Flash-based UI
 Still camera: 8-megapixel autofocus camera with LED flash, touch focus, geo-tagging, face detection, smile detection, image stabilizer, smart contrast
 Video recording: VGA video recording at 30 frame/s
 Connectivity: Wi-Fi, Bluetooth 2.0 with A2DP, GPS receiver with A-GPS support
 Misc: Partial touchscreen functionality, accelerometer for screen auto rotate, FM radio with RDS, Remote Play for PlayStation 3
 Battery: 1000 mAh battery

Touchscreen features are only accessible in with certain features of the phone.

Features

Camera
 Camera - 8.1-megapixel
 Digital zoom - up to 16x
 Photo feeds
 Geo tagging
 Video stabiliser
 Video recording
 Red-eye reduction
 Video blogging
 Picture blogging
 Photo flash
 Image stabiliser
 Photo fix
 BestPic
 Face detection
 Touch focus
 Auto focus

Connectivity
 aGPS
 Bluetooth technology
 DLNA Certified
 Google Maps
 Modem
 PictBridge
 Remote Play
 Synchronisation
 USB mass storage
 USB support
 WiFi

Communication
 Video calling (Main camera)
 Vibrating Alert
 Bluetooth wireless headset
 Polyphonic ringtones

Internet
 Web feeds
 WAP 2.0 XHTML

Entertainment
 Radio - FM radio with RDS
 Tracker
 Walk Mate
 Video viewing
 Video streaming
 Java
 Motion gaming
 3D games
 Media

Music
 Music tones - MP3, AAC
 TrackID
 Shake control
 SensMe
 PlayNow
 Stereo speakers
 Bluetooth stereo (A2DP)
 Album art
 Clear stereo
 Clear bass
 Media Player

Remote Play
Like the Sony PSP, the Aino features PlayStation 3 connectivity, called Remote Play. This allows the phone to be able to turn the PS3 on from anywhere in the world and stream its media files. This is the first phone to implement this, as it was previously only available on PlayStation Portable.

External links
Official website

Aino
Mobile phones introduced in 2009